Blanche of Portugal (25 February 1259 in Santarém, – 17 April 1321 in Burgos;  Branca  in Portuguese and Blanca in Spanish), was an infanta, the firstborn child of King Afonso III of Portugal and his second wife Beatrice of Castile. Named after her great-aunt Blanche of Castile, queen of France, Blanche was the Lady of Las Huelgas, Montemor-o-Velho, Alcocer and Briviesca, the city which she founded.

Biographical sketch 
Born in Santarém, when Blanche  was two years old, her father gave her, as a perpetual donation, the city of Montemor-o-Velho with the condition that it would revert to the crown upon her death or in the event that she married outside of Portugal. Following the footsteps of her great-aunt, queen Theresa of Portugal, Queen of León and other female members of the royal house and nobility, she went to live at the Monastery of Lorvão in 1277 although at that time she was not a nun and was never the abbess of this religious establishment.

In 1282, she accompanied her mother, Queen Beatrice, to Castile, due to differences with her brother King Denis of Portugal and coinciding with the conflict between her maternal grandfather, King Alfonso X and infante Sancho, the future King Sancho IV. There is documentary proof that mother and daughter were living in 1283 in Seville with the king who in his will mentioned his granddaughter Blanche and left her a substantial sum for her marriage.

In 1295, she became a nun at the Convent of Las Huelgas, as evidenced by a letter dated 15 April 1295 detailing the reasons that led her to become a nun at the recommendation and instructions of her uncle King Sancho IV of Castile, even though at first she had been reluctant to enter the religious order. 

She brought to the convent her dowry which consisted of several villages and properties and in 1303 donated to the convent the salt mines at Poza de la Sal and at Añana. Called the lady and keeper of the convent, Blanche was never its abbess, since during that time, between 1296 and 1326, Las Huelgas was governed by abbess Urraca Alfonso.

In 1303, upon her mother's death, Blanche inherited the señorío of Alcocer. On 27 September 1305, she purchased for 170,000 maravedíes from Juana Gómez de Manzanedo, the widow of infante Louis, son of Ferdinand III of Castile, her inheritance in the city of Briviesca. She is considered the founder of the city as its sponsor and coordinator, and was also responsible for the founding of Colegiata de Santa María. "Her work was not limited to the urban planning of the new city, the layout of its streets (...) she also granted it a legal instrument for its governance and administration, the Fuero of 1313, which was inspired by the text of the Royal Fuero".

Will, death, and burial 

She executed a will on 15 April 1321  where she ordered her burial at the Convent of Las Huelgas and also asked that ten thousand masses were to be celebrated for the good of her soul. In her will, she granted the city of Briviesca to King Alfonso XI of Castile with the condition that the city was never to be a señorío, that the king was to pay her debts totalling 300,000 maravedís, and entrusted him with the protection of the city and of the Colegiata de Santa María la Mayor which she had founded. Blanche named several executors of her will, including Queen María de Molina and Gonzalo de Hinojosa, the bishop of Burgos.

Infanta Blanche died at the Convent on 17 April 1321.  Her sepulchre is decorated with intertwined stars and with the arms of the kingdoms of Castile, León, and of the Kingdom of Portugal.

Issue 
She had a son out of wedlock by a Portuguese nobleman named Pedro Nunes Carpinteiro, or Pedro Estevanez Carpenteyro as recorded in the chronicles of Rui de Pina and of Alfonso XI: 
 Juan Núñez de Prado, Master of the Order of Calatrava and vassal of King Alfonso XI of Castile and his son King Pedro of Castile, who had him killed  in 1355 at the castle in Maqueda.

Ancestry

Notes

References

Bibliography 

 
 
 
 
 
 
 
 
 

Branca, Infanta of Portugal
Branca, Infanta of Portugal
People from Guimarães
People from Santarém, Portugal
Branca, Infanta of Portugal
Branca, Infanta of Portugal
Portuguese Roman Catholics
Burials at the Abbey of Santa María la Real de Las Huelgas
13th-century Portuguese nuns
14th-century Portuguese nuns
14th-century women rulers
Daughters of kings